Relamorelin (INN, USAN) (developmental code names RM-131, BIM-28131, BIM-28163) is a synthetic peptide, centrally penetrant, selective agonist of the ghrelin/growth hormone secretagogue receptor (GHSR) which is under development by Allergan pharmaceuticals for the treatment of diabetic gastroparesis, chronic idiopathic constipation, and anorexia nervosa. It is a pentapeptide and an analogue of ghrelin with improved potency and pharmacokinetics. In humans, relamorelin produces increases in plasma growth hormone, prolactin, and cortisol levels, and, like other GHSR agonists, increases appetite. As of June 2015, relamorelin is in phase II clinical trials for diabetic gastroparesis and constipation. The United States Food and Drug Administration (FDA) has granted Fast Track designation to relamorelin for diabetic gastroparesis.

See also 
 List of growth hormone secretagogues

References

External links 
 Relamorelin (RM-131): Ghrelin Peptide Agonist: A New Drug Class for the Treatment of GI Functional Disorders – Rhythm Pharmaceuticals
 Relamorelin – AdisInsight

Amines
Appetite stimulants
Benzothiophenes
Carboxamides
Drugs acting on the gastrointestinal system and metabolism
Experimental drugs
Ghrelin receptor agonists
Growth hormone secretagogues
Motility stimulants
Piperidines
Pentapeptides